DMACK World Rally Team was a team that competed in the World Rally Championship since 2012 until 2017.

History
Beginning with the 2011 season, DMACK began supplying tyres for the Scottish Rally Championship and the Production World Rally Championship.  The company made its World Rally Championship debut at the 2011 Wales Rally GB on the car of Ott Tänak.

In 2017, DMack did not enter as a team, but M-Sport WRT driver Elfyn Evans drove with DMack tyres. He won the 2017 Wales Rally GB.

The team was disbanded by end of 2017.

WRC results

WRC2 results

See also
M-Sport World Rally Team

References

External links

World Rally Championship teams
European Rally Championship teams
British auto racing teams
Auto racing teams established in 2012
Auto racing teams disestablished in 2017